Saylorville Lake is a reservoir on the Des Moines River in Iowa, United States. It was constructed as part of a flood control system for the Des Moines River as well as to aid in controlling flood crests on the Mississippi, of which the Des Moines is a tributary. The lake and dam is owned and operated by the U.S. Army Corps of Engineers, Rock Island District.

At this point any further flow into the lake is channelled over an emergency spillway to the west of the main dam structure.

Construction of the Saylorville Dam was authorized by Congress in 1958. Excavation began at the site in July 1965, becoming fully operational in September 1977.

The lake is utilized for many recreational activities in the central Iowa area as well, as there is a large state park infrastructure surrounding the area of the lake, notably Jester Park and Big Creek State Park. The Corps of Engineers operates several recreation areas, campgrounds, and boat ramp facilities around the lake. Boating and swimming are very popular, as are camping, deer and game bird hunting, fishing, hiking, biking and disc golf. Coast Guard Auxiliary Flotilla 4 provides boating safety education and free vessel safety checks to boaters in the area.

Fish species that can be found in the lake include crappie, bluegill, green sunfish, largemouth bass, smallmouth bass, brown trout, northern pike, common carp, white bass, walleye, yellow bass, american eel, flathead catfish, channel catfish, bullheads, and hybrid striped bass.

See also 

 Des Moines River
 Lake Red Rock (Des Moines River)
 U.S. Army Corps of Engineers

References

External links 
 U.S. Army Corps of Engineers - Saylorville Lake
 Saylorville Lake - Recreation.gov, parks and recreation information, camping reservations
 Saylorville Lake Reservoir river levels
 
 Flotilla 33-4, District 8WR Web Site (USCG Auxiliary)

Bodies of water of Boone County, Iowa
Bodies of water of Dallas County, Iowa
Bodies of water of Polk County, Iowa
Reservoirs in Iowa
Dams in Iowa
United States Army Corps of Engineers dams